Talyllyn or Tal-y-llyn can refer to:

Tal-y-llyn, Gwynedd, the hamlet and former parish in Gwynedd in Wales
Tal-y-llyn Lake, a glacial ribbon lake east of Abergynolwyn
Talyllyn Railway, a preserved narrow gauge railway running from Tywyn to Abergynolwn
Talyllyn (locomotive), one of the original locomotives of the Talyllyn Railway
Talyllyn and Llanfihangel Talyllyn, small settlements in the Powys community of Llangors
Talyllyn Junction, a nearby junction on the Mid Wales Railway in Powys
Tal-y-llyn, Anglesey, a former episcopal township on Anglesey
St Mary's Church, Tal-y-llyn, the township's church